Claudio Costa (born 26 September 1963) is a former Italian a paralympic multi-sport athlete who won six medals at the Summer Paralympics from 1992 to 2000.

Achievements

Notes

See also
 Italian multiple medallists at the Summer Paralympics

References

External links
 
 Claudio Closta  at Associazione medaglie d'oro al valore atletico (AMOVA)
 

1963 births
Living people
Place of birth missing (living people)
Paralympic athletes of Italy
Paralympic cyclists of Italy
Paralympic gold medalists for Italy
Paralympic silver medalists for Italy
Paralympic bronze medalists for Italy
Paralympic medalists in wheelchair fencing
Cyclists at the 1996 Summer Paralympics
Cyclists at the 2000 Summer Paralympics
Athletes (track and field) at the 1988 Summer Paralympics
Athletes (track and field) at the 1992 Summer Paralympics
Medalists at the 1988 Summer Paralympics
Medalists at the 1992 Summer Paralympics
Medalists at the 1996 Summer Paralympics
Medalists at the 2000 Summer Paralympics
Italian male sprinters
Visually impaired sprinters
Paralympic sprinters